Masters Security Football Club is a Malawian football club based in Lilongwe and currently playing in the TNM Super League, the top division of Malawian football.

History
It was founded in 2010 in the capital Lilongwe with the name Masters Security Rangers and is owned by the company Masters Security Services, dedicated to the private security service.

The club was promoted to the Super League in 2016.

In 2018, has managed to won Malawi Carlsberg Cup and qualify to CAF Confederation Cup.

Honours
Malawi Carlsberg Cup:
 Winners (1): 2018

Central Region Football League
 Winners (1): 2016

Performance in CAF competitions
CAF Confederation Cup: 2 appearances
2018 – Preliminary Round
2019–20 – Preliminary Round

References

External links

Football clubs in Malawi
Works association football clubs in Malawi